Kapshagay Solar Plant (also known as Kapchagay Solar Plant) is a photovoltaic power station that is located in Kapchagay, Almaty Region, Kazakhstan, and occupies  of land. It has a capacity of 100Megawatts (MW), which corresponds to an annual production of approximately 140 Gigawatts (GW). Kapshagay Solar Plant cost 27.7 billion tenges (US$71 million) to build.

References

External Links 
 Interactive scholarly application, multimodal resources mashup (publications, images, videos). Link https://engineeringhistoricalmemory.com/SilkRoad.php?vis=sat&pid=105001&cid=&prac_id=1027

Solar power stations in Kazakhstan